Alec Kann (born August 8, 1990) is an American professional soccer player who plays as a goalkeeper for Major League Soccer club FC Cincinnati.

Career

Youth and college
Kann attended Lakeside High School (DeKalb County, Georgia), where he was a soccer starter for three years, including on the AAAA state title team (20-1-1 record) as a senior. Kann played four years of college soccer at Furman University between 2008 and 2011.

During his college years Kann also played with Mississippi Brilla in the USL Premier Development League during their 2010 season.

Professional
Kann signed with USL Pro club Charleston Battery on March 23, 2012. He was with the club through their entire 2012 season, but didn't make a first-team appearance.

On March 19, 2013, Kann signed with MLS club Chicago Fire. He was loaned out by Chicago to USL Pro club Charlotte Eagles in June 2014 and to United Soccer League affiliate club Saint Louis FC in March 2015.

Chicago declined the contract option on Kann following the 2015 season. He entered the 2015 MLS Re-Entry Draft and was selected by Sporting Kansas City in stage one.

On December 13, 2016, Atlanta United picked Kann in fifth round of the MLS Expansion Draft.

Following the 2021 season, Kann's contract optioned was declined by Atlanta.

FC Cincinnati opted to sign Kann to a two-year contract on December 16, 2021.

Personal
In addition to playing professionally, Kann coaches through private training to players in North Carolina.

References

External links
 

1990 births
Living people
American soccer players
Furman Paladins men's soccer players
Mississippi Brilla players
Charleston Battery players
Chicago Fire FC players
Charlotte Eagles players
Saint Louis FC players
Sporting Kansas City players
Sportspeople from DeKalb County, Georgia
Atlanta United FC players
Atlanta United 2 players
FC Cincinnati players
Association football goalkeepers
Soccer players from Georgia (U.S. state)
USL League Two players
USL Championship players
Major League Soccer players
People from Decatur, Georgia
MLS Next Pro players